Azizabad (also Romanized as ‘Azīzābād) is a village in Shirez Rural District, Bisotun District, Harsin County, Kermanshah Province, Iran. At the 2006 census, its population was 331, in 81 families.

References 

Populated places in Harsin County